Soumya Sankar Bose is an Indian documentary photographer. In his practice he uses photography, archival material and text to explore desire, identity and memory. His first book 'Where the Birds Never Sing(2020)' is on Marichjhapi massacre, the forcible eviction in 1979 of lower caste Bengali refugees on Marichjhapi Island in Sundarban, India, and the subsequent death of thousands by police gunfire, starvation, and disease. The Book was shortlisted for the First Photobook award in the  Paris Photo–Aperture Foundation PhotoBook Awards 2020.

Life and work
Soumya Sankar Bose is an independent documentary photographer, born and brought up in Midnapore, West Bengal India. His long-term project on retired Jatra (Bengal) artistes had been funded by India Foundation for the Arts. His work has reviewed by The New York Times, The Caravan, The Huffington Post, BBC, The Indian Express, The Telegraph, NPR and many more. Bose has worked on commission for clients including Le Monde, HSBC Bank, Bloomberg Businessweek Magazine, Financial Times, The Neue Zürcher Zeitung, Acumen, The Wall Street Journal etc.

Bose's work "Let's Sing an Old Song" explores concepts of nostalgia, modernity, performativity and the transformation of art in a changing world, his work both creates and documents reality. His portraits of Jatra artists are staged spectacles that evoke not only the tragedy of this waning tradition, but also those of its practitioners. Using photography as a performative medium rather than documentary tool, Bose brings an original approach to an often photographically explored space of dying art form in India.

Immersing the viewer in a surreal universe is crucial to Bose's project "Full moon on a Dark Night." By way of those portraits, Bose conducts a psychological exploration of a community of individuals who have been relentlessly persecuted by society because of their identities and their gender or sexual orientations. The work looks closely at the LGBT community in eastern India through a fantastical lens, often projecting a world devoid of restrictive laws and social taboos that the community regularly comes up against. Other images in the work are responses to these very constraints imposed by the state and society. It is here that Bose makes use of visual metaphors—a gas mask, a tiger in the wild, a choppy sea engulfing a man struggling against the current—to evoke notions of censorship and surveillance and feelings of suffocation and anxiety.

Soumya Sankar Bose’s project Where The Birds Never Sing (2017-2020) brought together Bose’s long-term project on the Marichjhapi massacre, the forcible eviction in 1979 of Bengali lower caste refugees from the Marichjhapi Island in Sundarbans, West Bengal, India and the subsequent death of thousands by police gunfire, starvation, and disease. Experimenter Outpost takes this project back to Kumirmari, Sundarbans, near the Marichjhapi island through a series of enlarged reproductions of Bose’s images that mark the landscape. The images become sentinels, standing as silent witnesses of unspeakable atrocities committed over forty years ago, on a land that whispered into Bose’s ears incredible stories of loss, memory and the complex political history it represents.

Publications
Where the Birds Never Sing Kolkata: self-published (Red Turtle Photobook), 2020. . Edition of 600 copies.
Let's sing an old song Kolkata: self-published (Red Turtle Photobook), 2021. . Edition of 500 copies.

Awards and fellowships

 2020- The Foundation for Indian Contemporary Art's Amol Vadehra Art Grant.
 2020- The Agroecology Fund in collaboration with Magnum Foundation.
 2019- Goethe-Insitut / Max Mueller Bhavan's Five Million Incidents.
 2019- World Press Photo's Joop Swart Masterclass. 
 2019- India foundation for the Arts' Photo Book grant.
 2018- Magnum Foundation & Henry Luce Foundation's Migration & Religion grant.
 2017- Magnum Foundation's Photography and Social Justice Fellowship.
 2015 & 17- India foundation for the Arts grant under the Arts Practice Programme.
 2015- The Toto Emerging Photographer of the Year.

References

External links

 Interview NPR, June, 2019

People from Midnapore
Living people
1990 births
Indian portrait photographers
Documentary photographers
21st-century Indian photographers
Bengali male artists
Bengali Hindus
Indian contemporary artists
21st-century Bengalis
Photographers from West Bengal